The National Socialist Program, also known as the 25-point Program or the 25-point Plan, was the party program of the National Socialist German Workers' Party (NSDAP, and referred to in English as the Nazi Party). Adolf Hitler announced the party's program on 24 February 1920 before approximately 2,000 people in the Munich Festival of the Hofbräuhaus and within the program was written "The leaders of the Party swear to go straight forward, if necessary to sacrifice their lives in securing fulfilment of the foregoing points" and declared the program unalterable. The National Socialist Program originated at a DAP congress in Vienna, then was taken to Munich, by the civil engineer and theorist Rudolf Jung, who having explicitly supported Hitler had been expelled from Czechoslovakia because of his political agitation.

The historian Karl Dietrich Bracher summarizes the program by saying that its components were "hardly new" and that "German, Austrian and Bohemian proponents of anti-capitalist, nationalist-imperialist, anti-Semitic movements were resorted to in its compilation" but that a call to "breaking the shackles of finance capital" was added in deference to the idee fixe of Gottfried Feder, one of the party's founding members and Hitler provided the militancy of the stance against the Treaty of Versailles and the insistence that the points could not be changed and were to be the permanent foundation of the party.  Bracher characterizes the points as being "phrased like slogans; they lent themselves to the concise sensational dissemination of the 'anti' position on which the party thrived. ... Ideologically speaking, [the program] was a wooly, eclectic mixture of political, social, racist, national-imperialist wishful thinking..."

According to the US Holocaust Memorial Museum, the 25-point program "remained the party's official statement of goals, though in later years many points were ignored".

German Party program
In Munich, on 24 February 1920, Hitler publicly proclaimed the 25-point Program of the NSDAP (National Socialist German Workers' Party, referred to in English as the Nazi Party), when the Nazis were still known as the DAP (German Workers' Party). They retained the National Socialist Program upon renaming themselves as the National Socialist German Workers Party (NSDAP) in February 1920 and it remained the Party's official program. The 25-point Program was a German adaptation — by Anton Drexler, Adolf Hitler, Gottfried Feder and Dietrich Eckart — of Rudolf Jung's Austro–Bohemian program. Unlike the Austrians, the Germans did not claim to be either liberal or democratic and opposed neither political reaction nor the aristocracy, yet advocated democratic institutions (i.e. the German central parliament) and voting rights solely for Germans — implying that a Nazi government would retain popular suffrage.

The Austrian monarchist Erik von Kuehnelt-Leddihn proposed that the 25-point Program was pro-labour: "[T]he program championed the right to employment, and called for the institution of profit sharing, confiscation of war profits, prosecution of usurers and profiteers, nationalization of trusts, communalization of department stores, extension of the old-age pension system, creation of a national education program of all classes, prohibition of child labour, and an end to the dominance of investment capital". Whereas historian William Brustein proposes that said program points and party founder Drexler's statements indicate that the Nazi Party (NSDAP) originated as a working-class political party.

In the course of pursuing public office, the agrarian failures of the 1920s prompted Hitler to further explain the "true" meaning of Point 17 (land reform, legal land expropriation for public utility, abolishment of the land value tax and proscription of land speculation), in the hope of winning the farmers' votes in the May 1928 elections. Hitler disguised the implicit contradictions of Point 17 of the National Socialist Program, by explaining that "gratuitous expropriation concerns only the creation of legal opportunities, to expropriate, if necessary, land which has been illegally acquired, or is not administered from the view-point of the national welfare. This is directed primarily against the Jewish land-speculation companies".

Throughout the 1920s, other members of the NSDAP, seeking ideologic consistency, sought either to change or to replace the National Socialist Program. In 1924, the economist Gottfried Feder proposed a 39-point program retaining some original policies and introducing new policies. Hitler suppressed every instance of programmatic change by refusing to broach the matters after 1925, because the National Socialist Program was “inviolable”, hence immutable.

Historian Karl Dietrich Bracher writes that to Hitler the program was "little more than an effective, persuasive propaganda weapon for mobilizing and manipulating the masses. Once it had brought him to power, it became pure decoration: 'unalterable,' yet unrealized in its demands for nationalization and expropriation, for land reform and 'breaking the shackles of finance capital.' Yet it nonetheless fulfilled its role as backdrop and pseudo-theory, against which the future dictator could unfold his rhetorical and dramatic talents."

The 25-point Program of the NSDAP
 We demand the union of all Germans to form the Greater Germany on the basis of the people's right to self-determination enjoyed by the nations.
 We demand equality of rights for the German people in its dealings with other nations; and abolition of the peace treaties of Versailles and St. Germain.
 We demand land and territory (colonies) for the sustenance of our people and colonization for our superfluous population.
 None but members of the nation may be citizens of the state. None but those of German blood, whatever their creed may be. No Jew, therefore, may be a member of the nation.
 Whoever has no citizenship is to be able to live in Germany only as a guest and must be regarded as being subject to foreign laws.
 The right of voting on the state's government and legislation is to be enjoyed by the citizen of the state alone. We demand therefore that all official appointments, of whatever kind, shall be granted to citizens of the state alone. We oppose the corrupting custom of parliament of filling posts merely with a view to party considerations, and without reference to character or capability.
 We demand that the state be charged first with providing the opportunity for a livelihood and way of life for the citizens. If it is impossible to nourish the total population of the State, then the members of foreign nations (non-citizens) must be excluded from the Reich.
 All immigration of non-Germans must be prevented. We demand that all non-Germans, who have immigrated to Germany since 2 August 1914, be required immediately to leave the Reich.
 All citizens of the state shall be equal as regards rights and obligations.
 The first obligation of every citizen must be to productively work mentally or physically. The activity of individual may not clash with the interests of the whole, but must proceed within the framework of the whole for the benefit for the general good. We demand therefore:
 Abolition of unearned (work and labour) incomes. Breaking of debt (interest)-slavery.
 In consideration of the monstrous sacrifice of life and property that each war demands of the people, personal enrichment due to a war must be regarded as a crime against the nation. Therefore, we demand ruthless  confiscation of all war profits.
 We demand nationalization of all businesses which have been up to the present formed into companies (trusts).
 We demand that the profits from wholesale trade shall be shared out.
 We demand an expansion on a large scale of old age welfare.
 We demand the creation of a healthy middle class and its conservation, immediate communalization of the great warehouses and their being leased at low cost to small firms, the utmost consideration of all small firms in contracts with the State, county or municipality.
 We demand a land reform suitable to our needs, provision of a law for the free expropriation of land for the purposes of public utility, abolition of taxes on land and prevention of all speculation in land.
 We demand struggle without consideration against those whose activity is injurious to the general interest. Common national criminals, usurers, profiteers and so forth are to be punished with death, without consideration of confession or race.
 We demand substitution of a German common law in place of the Roman Law serving a materialistic world-order.
 The state is to be responsible for a fundamental reconstruction of our whole national education program, to enable every capable and industrious German to obtain higher education and subsequently introduction into leading positions. The plans of instruction of all educational institutions are to conform with the experiences of practical life. The comprehension of the concept of the state must be striven for by the school [Staatsbürgerkunde] as early as the beginning of understanding. We demand the education at the expense of the state of outstanding intellectually gifted children of poor parents without consideration of position or profession.
 The state is to care for the elevating national health by protecting the mother and child, by outlawing child-labor, by the encouragement of physical fitness, by means of the legal establishment of a gymnastic and sport obligation, by the utmost support of all organizations concerned with the physical instruction of the young.
 We demand abolition of the mercenary troops and formation of a national army.
 We demand legal opposition to known lies and their promulgation through the press. In order to enable the provision of a German press, we demand, that: 
 a. All writers and employees of the newspapers appearing in the German language be members of the race;
 b. Non-German newspapers be required to have the express permission of the state to be published. They may not be printed in the German language;
 c. Non-Germans are forbidden by law any financial interest in German publications or any influence on them and as punishment for violations the closing of such a publication as well as the immediate expulsion from the Reich of the non-German concerned. Publications which are counter to the general good are to be forbidden. We demand legal prosecution of artistic and literary forms which exert a destructive influence on our national life and the closure of organizations opposing the above made demands.
 We demand freedom of religion for all religious denominations within the state so long as they do not endanger its existence or oppose the moral senses of the Germanic race. The Party as such advocates the standpoint of a positive Christianity without binding itself confessionally to any one denomination. It combats the Jewish-materialistic spirit within and around us and is convinced that a lasting recovery of our nation can only succeed from within on the framework.
THE COMMON INTEREST OVER INDIVIDUAL INTEREST
 For the execution of all of this we demand the formation of a strong central power in the Reich. Unlimited authority of the central parliament over the whole Reich and its organizations in general. The forming of state and profession chambers for the execution of the laws made by the Reich within the various states of the confederation. The leaders of the Party promise, if necessary by sacrificing their own lives, to support by the execution of the points set forth above without consideration.

See also
Fascist Manifesto
Manifesto of the Fascist Intellectuals
Nazism
Strasserism
Twelve Theses

References

External links

Full text of the 25 point NSDAP program

Political theories
Political manifestos
Early Nazism (–1933)
Economics of fascism
Party platforms
1920 documents